Leningradsky District is the name of several administrative and municipal districts in Russia.

Districts of the federal subjects

Leningradsky District, Krasnodar Krai, an administrative and municipal district of Krasnodar Krai

City divisions
Leningradsky Administrative District, Kaliningrad, an administrative district of the city of Kaliningrad, the administrative center of Kaliningrad Oblast

See also
Leningradsky (disambiguation)

References